The National Republican Party was a Salvadoran political party that existed from 1930 to 1931.

The party was founded by Brigadier General Maximiliano Hernández Martínez and ran in the 1931 general election. The party joined a coalition with Arturo Araujo's Labor Party during the 1931 general election. The coalition failed to win a majority but Araujo was elected president by the Legislative Assembly and Maximiliano Hernández Martínez became Vice President.

The party was dissolved following the 1931 Salvadoran coup d'état but was later turned into the National Pro Patria Party.

Electoral history

Presidential elections

Legislative Assembly elections

See also 

1931 Salvadoran general election
Labor Party (El Salvador)
National Pro Patria Party

References 

1930s establishments in El Salvador
1930s disestablishments in El Salvador
Defunct political parties in El Salvador
Political parties established in 1930
Political parties disestablished in 1931